This article summarizes the events, album releases, and album release dates in hip hop music for the year 2002.

Events

April
 On April 25, Lisa "Left Eye" Lopes died in Honduras

June
On June 15, Big Mello died.

October
On October 30, Jam Master Jay died  in New York City

Released albums

Highest-charting singles

Highest first-week sales

All critically reviewed albums ranked (Metacritic)

See also
Previous article: 2001 in hip hop music
Next article: 2003 in hip hop music

References

2000s in hip hop music
Hip hop
Hip hop music by year